The 1990 Kansas gubernatorial election took place on November 6, 1990. Incumbent Republican Governor Mike Hayden lost re-election to Democratic nominee Joan Finney.

The State Treasurer at the time, Finney was elected governor over Hayden in 1990, giving Hayden the distinction of being the first incumbent governor of any state to lose to a woman. In addition to being Kansas's first female governor, she was Kansas' oldest governor at the age of 65 until Laura Kelly took office at the age of 68 in 2019, Kansas' first Roman Catholic Governor, and one of the few anti-abortion Democratic Governors at the time.

, this was the last time in which an incumbent Kansas Governor lost re-election in a general election.

Background
Hayden was chosen as chair of the Republican Governors Association. His term saw tax cuts and programs to combat substance abuse. A split in the Kansas Republican Party between moderates and conservatives considerably reduced other accomplishments. He was perceived as a moderate; on abortion, for instance, he took a pro-choice position. Because of the legislative gridlock, he did not reinstate the death penalty. 

It is speculated that Hayden lost his re-election bid primarily because of voter passage of a property reclassification amendment in Kansas which resulted in property reappraisals – the first in some cases in 20 years – and the resulting property tax increases when market values were applied to properties for tax purposes.

Candidates

Republican
Mike Hayden, incumbent Governor

Democratic
Joan Finney, State Treasurer
John W. Carlin, former Governor

Independent
Christina Campbell-Cline, CPA

General election

Results

References
 

Gubernatorial
1990
Kansas